Charles Kittel (July 18, 1916 – May 15, 2019) was an American physicist. He was a professor at University of California, Berkeley from 1951 and was professor emeritus from 1978 until his death.

Life and work 
Charles Kittel was born in New York City in 1916. He studied at the University of Cambridge, England, where he obtained his Bachelor of Arts (BA) in 1938. He published his thesis, under Gregory Breit, in 1941 at the University of Wisconsin–Madison and joined the Massachusetts Institute of Technology (MIT) between 1945 and 1947. During World War II, he joined the Submarine Operations Research Group (SORG). (He is mentioned on page 478 of RV Jones' book Most Secret War, published 1978.)  He served in the United States Navy as a naval attache. From 1947 to 1951, he worked for Bell Laboratories, New Jersey, USA, especially on ferromagnetism.

From 1951 to 1978, he worked at the University of California, Berkeley, where he taught and did research in the field of theoretical solid-state physics, a part of condensed-matter physics. He was awarded a Guggenheim Fellowship in 1945, 1956 and 1963. Many well-known postdoctoral fellows worked with him, including James C. Phillips and Pierre-Gilles de Gennes.

Among other achievements, Kittel is credited with the theoretical discovery of the RKKY interaction (the first K standing for Kittel) and the Kittel magnon mode in ferromagnets.

Physics students worldwide study his classic text Introduction to Solid State Physics, now in its 8th edition. He was a member of the U.S. National Academy of Sciences, elected in 1957.

Kittel died on May 15, 2019, at the age of 102.

Awards 
Oliver E. Buckley Condensed Matter Prize, 1957
Berkeley Distinguished Teacher Award, 1970
Oersted Medal, American Association of Physics Teachers, 1979

Works 
Introduction to Solid State Physics, 1st ed. 1953 - 8th ed. 2005, 
Quantum Theory of Solids, 1963,  and (with C. Y. Fong) 1987, 
Thermal Physics, 2nd ed. 1980, and (with H. Kroemer) 1980.
Berkeley Physics Course. Mechanics. Vol. 1, with Walter Knight and Malvin A. Ruderman
 Reprinted five times by 1967; a reproduction was published in 2004 by Dover.

See also
Antiferroelectricity
Ferromagnetic resonance
Single domain (magnetic)

References

External links 

Freeman Dyson on work at Berkeley with Charles Kittel
Charles Kittel (Physics History Network)

1916 births
2019 deaths
21st-century American physicists
University of Wisconsin–Madison alumni
Alumni of the University of Cambridge
American centenarians
Men centenarians
American materials scientists
Massachusetts Institute of Technology faculty
Members of the United States National Academy of Sciences
Military personnel from New York City
Oliver E. Buckley Condensed Matter Prize winners
Quantum physicists
Scientists from New York City
Semiconductor physicists
University of California, Berkeley College of Letters and Science faculty
Fellows of the American Physical Society
American expatriates in the United Kingdom